Hendrik Zwaardemaker ( – ) was a Dutch scientist who invented the olfactometer in 1888.

From 1897 to 1927 he was professor of Experimental Physiology at the University of Utrecht. In 1903 he became member of the Royal Netherlands Academy of Arts and Sciences. In addition to his work on the sense of smell, he also conducted research on the human heart. He found that salts of potassium and other radioactive elements stimulated the heart.
His major work was "Die Physiologie des Geruchs" (Physiologie of Olfaction), it appeared in 1895.

Zwaardemaker Pairs 
An important contribution of Zwaardemaker's studies is the concept of odor conjugates. Zwaardemaker discovered that certain odors could be prevented from detection by smell senses when mixed with various essential oils. These combination of odors are referred to as Zwaardemaker Pairs, (or Z-pairs).

References 

19th-century Dutch inventors
Dutch physiologists
1857 births
1930 deaths
Members of the Royal Netherlands Academy of Arts and Sciences
Scientists from Haarlem
Academic staff of Utrecht University
19th-century Dutch scientists
20th-century Dutch scientists